HTC One may refer to:
HTC One series, an HTC flagship smartphone product line
HTC One (M7), a smartphone released by HTC in 2013, originally released as the HTC One
HTC One (M8), a smartphone released by HTC in 2014
HTC One M9, a smartphone released by HTC in 2015
HTC 10, a smartphone released by HTC in 2016
HTC One Mini, a smartphone released by HTC in 2013
HTC One Mini 2, a smartphone released by HTC in 2014